The Wayanad District of Kerala, India has a wide variety of tourist attractions ranging from religious sites to natural, and historical sites. This district is divided into three towns, Kalpetta, Sultan Bathery and Mananthavady. All Major Tourism destinations in the district are maintained by the District Tourism Promotion Council (Department of Tourism, Government of Kerala).

Religious sites 
 Thirunelli Temple is an ancient temple dedicated to Lord Maha Vishnu. It is situated on the side of Brahmagiri hill in Kerala, which is about 30 kilometers away from Mananthavady (Wayanad district). The name Thirunelli derived from the nelli, the Tamil/Malayalam and Kannada word for Indian gooseberry of the Amla tree. According to tradition, Lord Brahma was traveling round the Universe on his hamsa, when he became attracted by the beauty of the area now known as Brahmagiri Hill. Descending on that spot, Brahma noticed an idol, set in an Amla tree. Brahma recognized the idol as Lord Vishnu Himself and the place as Vaikuntha (Vishnuloka) itself. With the help of the Devas, Brahma installed the idol and called it Sahyamalak Kshetra. At Brahma’s request Vishnu promised that the waters of the area would wash away all sins. (Thus, the spring and river near the temple is called Papanasini: "washes away all sins"). Even today the head priest of the temple leaves a portion of the worship materials in the belief that Lord Brahma Himself will come and perform pooja rites deep in the holy hours of morning. The famous incarnation of Lord Vishnu Parasurama is reputed to have visited Thirunelli and performed last rites of his father sage Jamadagni. He also took immersion in the Papanasini to wipe away sins committed in killing Kshatriyas.
 Puliyarmala Jain Temple dates back to the 13th century. The temple includes a Dravidian style architecture, beams and pillars carved out of stones, a stone slab roof, and engravings on the doors and walls throughout the temple. The temple is believed to be used as the ammunitions store of Tipu Sultan, the ruler of Mysore. Dedicated to Jain Tirthankar, the temple is also named Ananthantha Swami Temple. Now, this serene place is under the supervision of the local archaeological department. They have maintained it properly with grass walkways and surrounding gardens.
 The three Edakkal Caves are located at a height of 1000 m on Ambukuthi Mala, near Sultan Bathery. The new stone age pictorial writings on the walls of these natural caves at Edakkal, shed light on the ancient civilizations that existed within the regions. The caves can be accessed only by a kilometer long trekking trail from the nearest parking area.
 Kayakkunn Ancient Stone Temple – 16.6 km

Nature sites
 Bandipur National Park in southern Karnataka is an 874-km2 forested reserve and is known for its small population of tigers. Once the private hunting ground of the Maharajas of Mysore, the park is also home to Indian elephants, spotted deer, bison (gaurs), antelope and numerous other native species and endangered wildlife. The 14th-century Himavad Gopalaswamy temple offers views from the park's highest peak. Most visitors arrive Dec–Jan, and Apr-May when the weather is mostly dry as the monsoon season runs Jun-Oct. The climate is tropical and hot year-round.
 Wayanad Wildlife Sanctuary at Muthanga is contiguous to the protected area network, with Nagarhole and Bandipur of Karnataka to the north-east and Muthumala of Tamil Nadu to the south-east. Rich in Biodiversity, the sanctuary is an integral part of the Nilgiri Biosphere Reserve, which has been established with the specific objective of conserving the biological heritage of the region. The sanctuary is rich in flora and fauna. The management lays emphasis on scientific conservation with due consideration for the general lifestyles of tribals and others who live in and around the forest.  The vegetation is predominantly moist deciduous forest with small stretches of swamp, teak, bamboo and tall grass. Amidst such fertile and varied flora, this region hosts several rare herbs and medicinal plants. Due to the decent amount of watering holes in the area, Muthanga has a large population of pachyderms and has been declared a Project Elephant site.  Some other animals that can be found there are jungle cat, panthers, civet cat, monkeys, wild dogs, spotted deer, bison, gaur, cheetah, sloth bear, peacock, owls, jungle fowls, woodpeckers, babblers, and cuckoos. The reserve is also home to a small population of tigers.
 Banasura Sagar Dam – 24 km – considered the largest earthen dam in India.
 Kayakkunn Ancient Stone Temple – is a small city near Nadavayal, Mananthavady, in the Wayanad District, Kerala, India. The city belongs to Panamaram Panchayath, and the assembly constituency is Mananthavady (North Wayanad). 22.1 km
 Soochipara Falls, also known as Sentinel Rock Falls – 20 km
 Lakkidi View Point
 Karalad Lake – 16 km
 Philately and Numismatics Museum – adjacent to Banasura Sagar dam
 Meenmutty Falls – 25 km – 2 km jungle hike to spectacular waterfall
 Kanthanpara Falls – 22 km
 Kurumbalakotta - is a hill 15 kilometres (9.3 mi) west of Kalpetta in Wayanad district, Kerala. It is a monolith hillock in Kerala. It rises to 980 metres (3,220 ft) above sea level. It is situated in the centre of Wayanad and also a part of Deccan plateau and the confluence of Western Ghats
 Chembra Peak – At a height of 2100 metres, the towering Chembra Peak is located near Meppadi in the southern part of Wayanad. It is the tallest of peaks in the region and climbing this peak would test one's physical prowess. Climbing up the Chembra Peak is an exhilarating experience, as each stage in the climb unfolds great expanses of Wayanad and the view gets wider as one goes up to its summit. Going up and coming down the peak would take a full day. Those who would like to camp at the top are assured of an unforgettable experience.
 Neelimala View Point -near Meenmutty Falls – 27 km
 Sunrise Valley – a place to watch the rising and setting sunset amid dramatic mountain scenery – 22 km
 Mango Orange village near Pandallur has undulating tea estates.
 Kolagappara rock – a place for trekking. It is approximately 1900 metres above sea level and is located upon the western ghat of India.
 900 Kandi- off-road adventure spot

Toward Sulthan Bathery
Kayakkunn Ancient Stone Temple – 21.9 km
Karapuzha Dam – 17 km
Edakkal Caves – 28 km
Chethalayam Falls – 37 km
Muthanga Wildlife Sanctuary – 42 km
– 12 km
Sulthan Bathery Jain Temple – 24
RARS (Regional Agricultural Research Station) – 25 km
Phantom Rock – 26 km

Historical sites
 The Wayanad Heritage Museum, located in the Indian village of Ambalavayal is managed by the District Tourism Promotion Council. The Museum displays tribal relics and artifacts. Four sectors of the museum—the Verasmruthi, the Gothrasmruthi, the Devasmruthi, and the Jeevanasmruthi—house different types of items ranging from the Neotholic age to the 17th century, including artifacts from ordinary tribal life, decorated memorial grave stones once used to adorn the graves of heroes, and terracotta figures.
 The Mahatma Gandhi Memorial Museum and Library in Kalpetta, is a boarding house near the Jain Temple, where Gandhi took rest during his visit. The museum is located at Puliyarmala, about 4 km from Kalpetta.
 The Anantnath Swami Temple at Puliyarmala, is one of the very few present-day Jain temples in Kerala.
 Myladippara Trekking Centre.
 Myladippara is a cliff located to the east of the Civil Station, adjacent to the new NH bypass road. A trek to the Myladippara offers a charming experience, making it a great destination for tourists.

Other sites
 Blockbuster – 69 km
 Kuruva Islands – 40 km
 Tholpetty Wildlife Sanctuary – 59
 Pakshipathalam – 71 km 
 Pazhassi Raja's Tomb – 35 km
 Thirunelli Temple – 64 km
 Papanasini, Thirunelli – 64 km
 Pallikkunnu Church – 19 km
 Korome Mosque – 47 km
 Jain Temples (Ruined) at Punchavayal and Puthenangadi (near Panamaram) – 20 km
 Valliyoorkav Bhagavathi Temple – 24 km
 Seetha Lava-Kusha Temple – 50 km
 Thrissilery Shiva Temple – 50 km
 Brahmagiri – a 1608-meter peak (Actually, situated within borders of Karnataka State) – 61 km
 Paingatteri Agraharam – a settlement of Tamil Brahmins organized in the classic architectural typology of row houses – 28 km
 The Regional Agricultural Research Station (RARS) is located in a town called Ambalavayal and is part of the Kerala Agricultural University. This research station primarily conducts agricultural research on spices, tropical fruits, subtropical fruits, vegetables and hill paddies. RARS also has a nursery with a large collection of rare roses and ornamental plants where visitors can purchase seeds and saplings at the sales counter.

Best time to visit 
Winter and monsoon seasons are the best time for travelers to explore the spots. Even if there is something special to experience throughout the year. Climate is an important aspect of Wayanad tourism. We can go through the months and what you should experience.

Best Months to visit 

 November
 December
 January

References

Tourist attractions in Wayanad district